The Show To Be Named Later... was a late-night talk/variety sports show that ran on Minnesota's KARE/11. It was hosted by Jonny Voss. The show featured interviews with Minnesota's sports figures, in-depth analysis of Minnesota sports teams and athletes from the perspective of the show's host, and people he meets on the street and at sporting events, musical performances, and contests run by sponsors, including Best Buy & Jack Link's Beef Jerky. It was broadcast on KARE at 12:00 midnight, immediately following Saturday Night Live.

The show's main run was in 2005 and was recorded at the studios of WB affiliate KMWB, usually drawing a live audience of about 35 people. After only a few months on KARE, the show vanished from the late-night lineup, being replaced by infomercials. The show has been broadcast sporadically after its disappearance from its former late-night timeslot with an altered format. Producers dumped the original studio format and exclusively interviewed random people at sporting events asking their opinions on current events in the sports world, along with the host's perspective, and coverage of sporting events.

Local talk shows in the United States
American sports television series